TCFC may refer to:

Tadley Calleva F.C.
Thorne Colliery F.C.
Those Characters From Cleveland
Truro City F.C.
Tuam Celtic F.C.
Thornton Cleveleys F.C.